Rising Grace is a studio album by guitarist Wolfgang Muthspiel. It was released by ECM Records in 2016.

Background
Muthspiel's first album for ECM was Driftwood in 2014, a trio recording with bassist Larry Grenadier and drummer Brian Blade. For Rising Grace trumpeter Ambrose Akinmusire and pianist Brad Mehldau were added.

Music and recording
Muthspiel wrote all of the tracks, except for "Wolfgang's Waltz", which was composed by Brad Mehldau. The recordings were made over three days in south-eastern France.

The music does not follow the typical rhythm section plus soloists division, and "while some songs feature a conventional sequence of soloists, it's also common for Muthspiel, Akinmusire and Mehldau to share the soloing space as they weave melodies together."

The album was released by ECM on CD and two LPs on 28 October 2016.

Reception

Critic John Fordham suggested that "the music mingles echoes of Kenny Wheeler, the classical guitar sound of Ralph Towner and the songlike one of Pat Metheny, plus the quickwittedness of the mid-60s Miles Davis group". The Ottawa Citizen reviewer wrote: "Sonically ravishing and filled with profound, singular music that speaks beautifully of communion, Rising Grace will reward your full attention, over and over".

Track listing

Personnel
 Wolfgang Muthspiel – guitar
 Ambrose Akinmusire – trumpet
 Brad Mehldau – piano
 Larry Grenadier – double bass
 Brian Blade – drums

References

ECM Records albums